David Jason Hale (born June 30, 1967) is a United States district judge of the United States District Court for the Western District of Kentucky and former United States Attorney for the Western District of Kentucky.

Biography

Hale was born on June 30, 1967 at the United States Army hospital at Fort Campbell, Kentucky. He received a Bachelor of Arts degree in 1989 from Vanderbilt University. He received a Juris Doctor in 1992 from the University of Kentucky College of Law. From 1992 to 1994, he was an associate at the law firm of Brown, Todd and Heyburn. From 1995 to 1999, he served as an Assistant United States Attorney for the Western District of Kentucky. He joined the law firm of Reed, Weitkamp, Schell & Vice, PLLC, in 1999, becoming a partner in 2002, serving until his appointment as United States Attorney.

United States Attorney

On January 20, 2010, President Obama nominated Hale to serve as the United States Attorney for the Western District of Kentucky, in place of David L. Huber who had resigned. His nomination was reported by the Senate Judiciary Committee on April 22, 2010, and he was confirmed by the Senate on April 29, 2010. He took the oath of office on May 7, 2010.

Federal judicial service

On June 19, 2014, President Barack Obama nominated Hale to serve as a United States District Judge of the United States District Court for the Western District of Kentucky, to the seat vacated by Judge Charles Ralph Simpson III, who assumed senior status on February 1, 2013. On July 29, 2014, a hearing before the United States Senate Committee on the Judiciary was held on his nomination. On September 18, 2014, his nomination was reported out of committee by a voice vote. On December 1, 2014, Senate Majority Leader Harry Reid filed for cloture on his nomination. On Wednesday December 3, 2014 cloture was invoked by a 65–31 vote. He was later confirmed by a voice vote that same day. He received his judicial commission on December 10, 2014.

Notable case

On March 31, 2017, Hale ruled against the dismissal of a lawsuit accusing Donald Trump of inciting violence against protesters in Louisville, Kentucky. During a campaign rally on March 1, 2016, Trump repeatedly said  "get 'em out of here" while pointing at anti-Trump protesters. According to the protesters, as they were escorted out they were repeatedly shoved and punched by his supporters. Trump's attorneys moved for dismissal of the case, arguing he was protected by free speech laws, and wasn't trying to get his supporters to resort to violence.

References

External links

1967 births
Living people
Assistant United States Attorneys
Kentucky lawyers
Judges of the United States District Court for the Western District of Kentucky
People from Kentucky
United States Attorneys for the Western District of Kentucky
United States district court judges appointed by Barack Obama
21st-century American judges
University of Kentucky College of Law alumni
Vanderbilt University alumni